The Soul of Youth is a 1920 American silent drama film directed by William Desmond Taylor, produced  and distributed by Realart Pictures. Produced under the working title The Boy, it stars Lewis Sargent and Lila Lee.

The film has been preserved in the Library of Congress collection.

Plot
As described in a film magazine, Ed Simpson (Sargent), victim of prenatal influence and an unloved childhood, is introduced into the orphanage where his liveliness has made him the butt of taunting orphans and menacing officials. Love first comes into his life when he acquires a dog, and when it is ousted he follows, taking to the streets with his pal Mike (Butterworth). Through cunning the two boys obtain incriminating evidence that keeps a rascally politician from office. This paves the way for the clear supremacy of his rival, who gives Ed a home and adopts him. The getting of papers by the boys helps adjust a troubled love affair between Vera Hamilton (Lee) and Dick Armstrong (Collier), two friends of the youth, and makes possible their marriage. When Ed after leaving the home steals to satisfy his hunger, he helps himself to canned goods on the shelves of the Hamiltons, who eventually become his foster parents.

Cast
Lewis Sargent as Ed Simpson
Ernest Butterworth as Mike
Clyde Fillmore as Mr. Hamilton
Grace Morse as Mrs. Hamilton
Lila Lee as Vera Hamilton
Elizabeth Janes as Ruth Hamilton
William Collier, Jr. as Dick Armstrong
Claude Payton as Pete Moran
Betty Schade as Maggie
Fred Huntley as Mr. Hodge
Sylvia Ashton as Mrs. Hodge
Russ Powell as Patrolman Jones
Judge Ben Lindsey as himself
Mrs. Ben Lindsey as herself
Jane Keckley as Matron
Eunice Moore as Cook
Barbara Gurney as Baby's Mother

References

External links

Film still at silentfilm.org
the film on DVD and a 11" x 17" poster for purchase

1920 films
American silent feature films
Films directed by William Desmond Taylor
1920 drama films
Silent American drama films
American black-and-white films
Articles containing video clips
1920s American films